Nallachius is a genus of pleasing lacewings in the family Dilaridae. There are more than 20 described species in Nallachius.

Species
These 22 species belong to the genus Nallachius:

 Nallachius adamsi Penny, 1982
 Nallachius americanus (McLachlan, 1881)
 Nallachius bruchi Navás, 1923
 Nallachius championi (Navás, 1914)
 Nallachius dicolor Adams, 1970
 Nallachius furcatus Pires Machado & Rafael, 2010
 Nallachius hermosa (Banks, 1913)
 Nallachius infuscatus Penny, 1982
 Nallachius krooni Minter, 1986
 Nallachius limai Adams, 1970
 Nallachius loxanus Navás, 1911
 Nallachius maculatus Penny, 1982
 Nallachius martosi Monserrat, 2005
 Nallachius ovalis Adams, 1970
 Nallachius parkeri Penny, 1994
 Nallachius phantomellus Adams, 1970
 Nallachius ponomarenkoi Zakharenko, 1991
 Nallachius potiguar Pires Machado & Rafael, 2010
 Nallachius prestoni (McLachlan, 1880)
 Nallachius pulchellus (Banks, 1938)
 Nallachius pupillus (Navás, 1930)
 Nallachius reductus Carpenter, 1947

References

Further reading

External links

 

Hemerobiiformia
Articles created by Qbugbot